Charles Edward William Sheringham (born 17 April 1988) is an English professional footballer who plays as a striker for Dartford. He is the son of former England forward Teddy Sheringham.

Club career

Early career
Sheringham was born in Chingford, London, while his father Teddy was playing for Millwall. Sheringham followed in his father's footsteps by also progressing through Millwall's academy set–up, but he subsequently moved on to another of his father's former teams, Tottenham Hotspur. Having been released by "Spurs", Sheringham was given a trial at AFC Bournemouth which proved unsuccessful. On 11 October 2004, it was announced that the 16-year–old striker had been offered a trial at Championship side Ipswich Town. He was a member of the team that won the 2004–05 FA Youth Cup by beating Southampton 3–2 on aggregate on 23 April 2005 in front of a crowd of 14,889 at Portman Road, coming on as a 71st minute substitute for Danny Haynes. The young striker's performance impressed manager Joe Royle enough for him to be offered a one–year contract on 11 May 2005.

He was transferred to Charlton Athletic on a free transfer but failed to make an impact and was very soon released, after which he went on trial at Crystal Palace, playing several games for Kit Symons's reserve side. He impressed, and was kept on for the pre–season by manager Peter Taylor, scoring in a first team pre–season friendly at Stevenage Borough. He also impressed against the American Major League Soccer champions Los Angeles Galaxy which led to him being given a professional contract, on a month–by–month deal. He then impressed even further, and was given a full contract, lasting two years.

On 18 April 2007, Sheringham flew out to America with teammate Lewwis Spence to join Crystal Palace's feeder club Crystal Palace Baltimore on loan for four months, though he had to fly home early with a hairline fracture of the foot.

Sheringham was released at the end of the January 2008 transfer window without making a single first team appearance for "The Eagles". Following his release from Crystal Palace Sheringham headed to Denmark on an eight–day trial at Fremad Amager of the Danish 1st Division. The trial was set up by Teddy Sheringham, an old friend of Fremad Amager manager Jakob Friis-Hansen. However, the move fell through at the last minute.

Non–League career
Following the move to Denmark falling through, Sheringham had a brief, though successful, spell at Conference South side Cambridge City where he scored six league goals in only five league games. His impressive goal scoring tally attracted interest from fellow Conference South team Welling United and he signed for the club at the start of the 2008–09 season. Sheringham was Welling's top scorer that season, scoring 26 goals in all competitions of which 19 were in the league.

Sheringham then signed for another Conference South side, Bishop's Stortford on 15 May 2009. Once again he proved to be a great goal scorer by scoring 17 league goals in 28 league games for "The Bishops". His form attracted Conference side Histon and on 12 February 2010 Sheringham moved to Histon on loan until the end of the 2009–10 season. However, he failed to score in the loan period which saw him make 15 appearances for the club. On 17 June 2010, Sheringham signed for Conference South side Dartford. Here Sheringham rediscovered his goal scoring form, netting 30 league goals in 46 league games.

Football League career

AFC Bournemouth
His impressive form for Dartford attracted interest from League One side Bournemouth. In October 2011 he signed for Bournemouth on an 18-month contract. He made his Football League debut for the south coast club on 25 October 2011, coming on as a late substitute, against Colchester United. He scored his first football league goal in his sixth appearance against Brentford on Boxing Day 2011. The game, which would end up being his last for Bournemouth, ended 1–1. Following the Brentford game Sheringham suffered a severe foot injury and underwent surgery in October 2012. On 20 March 2013, he rejoined Conference side Dartford on an initial one-month loan deal. Three days later he scored in his first match back at the club, a 3–0 win against Gateshead. During the loan spell Sheringham played 10 games and scored four goals. He returned to Bournemouth after the last game of the 2012–13 Conference season on 20 April. Nine days later, on 29 April 2013, he was released by the newly promoted club.

AFC Wimbledon
On 21 June 2013, he joined League Two side AFC Wimbledon on a free transfer.

Return to non-League
On 21 March 2014, Sheringham joined Conference Premier side Salisbury City on a short term loan from AFC Wimbledon, making his debut as a 65th minute substitute against Wrexham. Sheringham scored his first goal for the club two weeks later: a last minute penalty in a 1–1 draw against Kidderminster Harriers. Sheringham went on to score 4 more goals for the club in the final 6 games of the 2013/14 season.

On 30 June 2014, Sheringham joined Conference South side Ebbsfleet United on a two-year contract, following his release by AFC Wimbledon.

After a successful loan spell with Hemel Hempstead during the 2016–17 season, Sheringham made the switch permanent following his release from Ebbsfleet United.

Saif Sporting Club
On 9 November 2017, Sheringham joined Bangladesh Football Premier League side Saif Sporting Club following a successful trial. On 13 November 2017, Charlie scored his first goal for the club on his debut against Dhaka Abahani where his team was victorious by 2–1 margin. He finished the season with six goals in 10 appearances, helping Saif to fourth place in the league, and qualification for the preliminary round of the 2018 AFC Cup.

Return to England
On 13 June 2018, it was announced that Sheringham had returned to Hemel Hempstead for the start of the 2018–19 season.

On 31 August 2018, it was announced that Sheringham had signed for Dartford, five years after his loan spell at the club. On 21 February 2020, Sheringham joined Leatherhead on a dual registration until the end of the 2019–20 season. On 26 November 2020, Sheringham signed for Chelmsford City on a six-week loan deal.

On 5 June 2021, Chelmsford City announced Sheringham had returned to the club on a permanent deal.

On 2 July 2022, Sheringham returned to Dartford for a fourth spell at the club.

Coaching career
During his time at Ebbsfleet, Sheringham was also working as a coach at Crystal Palace. In September 2019, following coaching roles in the academies at Crystal Palace and West Ham United, Sheringham was appointed in a P.E teaching role at Forest School - the school he attended from 1999 to 2004.

Honours
Ipswich Town
FA Youth Cup: 2004–05

References

External links
 
 

1988 births
Living people
Footballers from Chingford
People educated at Forest School, Walthamstow
English footballers
English expatriate footballers
Association football forwards
Charlton Athletic F.C. players
Millwall F.C. players
Tottenham Hotspur F.C. players
Ipswich Town F.C. players
Crystal Palace F.C. players
Crystal Palace Baltimore players
Cambridge City F.C. players
Welling United F.C. players
Bishop's Stortford F.C. players
Histon F.C. players
AFC Bournemouth players
Dartford F.C. players
AFC Wimbledon players
Salisbury City F.C. players
Ebbsfleet United F.C.
Saif SC players
Hemel Hempstead Town F.C. players
Leatherhead F.C. players
Chelmsford City F.C. players
Expatriate soccer players in the United States
Expatriate footballers in Bangladesh
English Football League players
Bangladesh Football Premier League players
USL Second Division players
National League (English football) players
English expatriate sportspeople in the United States
English expatriate sportspeople in Bangladesh
Association football coaches
Crystal Palace F.C. non-playing staff
West Ham United F.C. non-playing staff